Lesbian erasure is the tendency to ignore, remove, falsify, or reexplain evidence of lesbian women or relationships in history, academia, the news media, and other primary sources. Lesbian erasure also refers to instances wherein lesbian issues, activism, and identity is deemphasized or ignored within the LGBT community.

In history
Journalist and author Victoria Brownworth wrote that the erasure of lesbian sexuality from historical records "is similar to the erasure of all autonomous female sexuality: women's sexual desire has always been viewed, discussed and portrayed within the construct and purview of the male gaze". Oftentimes, erasure of lesbians is enabled when LGBT organizations fail to recognize the contributions of lesbians, such as when, in 2018, a statement by the National Center for Lesbian Rights about the Stonewall riots did not acknowledge Stormé DeLarverie's involvement in the uprising.

In 1974, Kathy Kozachenko became the first openly-gay political candidate in the United States to win an election. However, this achievement in LGBT history was incorrectly ascribed to San Francisco politician Harvey Milk.

In literature 
Some contemporary historians concur that American poet Emily Dickinson had an intimate relationship with her sister-in-law, Susan Gilbert; leading some academics to assert that she was a lesbian. Dickinson experts Ellen Louise Hart and Martha Nell Smith wrote that Gilbert was a muse to Dickinson, stating that "Emily's correspondence to Susan unequivocally acknowledges that their emotional, spiritual, and physical communion is vital to her creative insight and sensibilities." However, the Emily Dickinson Museum is ambiguous when discussing Dickinson's sexuality.

In music 
Author and women's history scholar Bonnie J. Morris wrote that many lesbian singers and musicians are erased from music and its history. As an example, she discusses a time when she asked her students to name "five openly-lesbian role models" and none mentioned a musical artist; showing that the presence of lesbians in the music world is overlooked or ignored in media.

In scholarship
While the traditional academic canon has recognized the contributions of gay men, those of lesbians have not received the same scrutiny. Political theorist Anna Marie Smith stated that lesbianism has been erased from the "official discourse" in Britain because lesbians are viewed as "responsible homosexuals" in a dichotomy between that and "dangerous gayness". As a result, lesbian sexual practices were not criminalized in Britain in ways similar to the criminalization of gay male sexual activities. Smith also points to the exclusion of women from AIDS research at the Centers for Disease Control and Prevention. Smith argues that these erasures result from sexism and suggests that these issues should be addressed directly by lesbian activism.

In advertising
Marcie Bianco, of the Clayman Institute for Gender Research at Stanford University, said that lesbian erasure occurs in advertising. Advertisers do not target lesbians when they are publicizing products to LGBT audiences. As an example, she cited the collapse of AfterEllen, which she says resulted from a lack of advertisers. The former Editor in Chief of AfterEllen, Karman Kregloe, stated that advertisers do not think of lesbians as women, and Trish Bendix observed that lesbians are assumed to like anything gay, even if it is male-focused.

Language and lesbian spaces
Bonnie J. Morris and many other lesbian activists, such as same-sex marriage groundbreaker Robin Tyler, Ashley Obinwanne, screenwriter and co-founder of the platform Lesbians Over Everything, and Memoree Joelle, former co-owner and Editor in Chief of AfterEllen, say the amorphous term queer, when used to describe lesbians, is a "disidentification" term that contributes to lesbian invisibility. In an interview about her 2016 novel Beyond the Screen Door, author Julia Diana Robertson discovered that her self-identification as a lesbian and her description of the novel's genre was changed to queer and queerness in the published quotes. At the 2018 Brighton Pride parade, the only instance where the word lesbian appeared was on a banner celebrating Stormé DeLarverie.

Shannon Keating of BuzzFeed, pointing to significantly more people especially the younger generation having identities outside of the gender binary, says that "against the increasingly colorful backdrop of gender diversity, a binary label like 'gay' or 'lesbian' starts to feel somewhat stale and stodgy". Keating also says some queer-identified women feel more comfortable with queer than lesbian because of ideas about gender essentialism, there now being more LGBT diversity, and the possibility of internalized homophobia. Keating stated that "the word 'lesbian' has carried such a deeply uncool connotation for so long—sometimes for terrible reasons (ugly, old-fashioned, essentialist stereotypes) and sometimes for extremely legitimate ones (a history of transmisogyny)—[that] it's worth considering if making the term cool is something we should really want at all."

Several feminist lesbian activists have lamented the rapidly increasing disappearance of many physical spaces, such as lesbian bars, women's bookstores, and music festivals, that were alternative lesbian spaces in which lesbian subculture thrived. Alexis Clements of Curve magazine said that the explanation for why so many lesbian spaces have closed or changed is unclear, but that "part of it is definitely economic" and part of it "relates to political changes", saying that "as legislation gradually shifts to reduce LGBT discrimination around things like marriage or employment, it may be that many now feel more integrated into the larger culture and don't see as much need for separate space or political activism." She also questioned if the change is generational, as "there's been a shift toward queer identities and politics that are born of a belief that gender and sexuality operate on a spectrum that doesn't necessarily fit into male/female or straight/gay/bi paradigms" while "others, still, prefer and believe in the need to create spaces that are more inclusive." 

Keating said that some aspects of gay male culture have been represented in mainstream culture "in a way lesbianism simply hasn't" and that "gay male spaces, from bars to entire city neighborhoods, have managed to maintain some modern relevance, while lesbian bars and bookstores have shuttered en masse across the country", but also that lesbian bars "and spaces across the country have gone out of business for reasons that have absolutely nothing to do with trans inclusion." Keating said that there are still places and events for lesbians, but that they are often under "a different, broader, more inclusive name" and "that's not necessarily erasure: That's evolution." Keating reasoned that "embracing gender diversity and welcoming queer people of all stripes have kept certain historically lesbian-only events and spaces alive, and allowed new ones to grow."

While Christina Cauterucci of Slate acknowledged internalized homophobia playing a part in some women who are same-sex attracted not using the word lesbian, she also attributed rejection of the term to inclusivity and wanting to use a broader term for spaces that were once traditionally labeled lesbian spaces. She stated that society has made it so that there is "more room for women than men to claim a fluid sexual orientation, meaning queer women are more likely to have current or former partners who aren't women" and that this is "why it's both easy and usually accurate to label circles of gay men as 'gay men'—and why gay men are relatively free from the perpetual infighting over labels and politics that seems common among segments of queer women." She stated while there exists those who lament the losses of lesbian bars and media outlets, "it's worth wondering how we might expect a dance party or magazine to cater to us when our identities and politics appear to prevent us from sharing a name."

Julia Diana Robertson of AfterEllen, speaking on the word lesbian being villainized and therefore erased, argued that queer is being used in place of lesbian because it is without definitive sexual boundaries and is considered cooler, which sends the message to young lesbians "that if their sexuality doesn't leave room [for others], it's outdated, uncool, or somehow irrelevant. And that's just plain homophobia disguised as being progressive." Cauterucci also stated, "Lesbian leaves no doubt that a woman's sexual and romantic affinities run toward other women. In a world that preferences heterosexual pairings, lesbians face a very different reality than queers-in-name-only, giving the term the power of a blunt, plainspoken, unapologetic declaration." Mary Grace Lewis of The Advocate, arguing that lesbian is not a dirty word, stated that it "has been villainized in the media because [lesbians] serve no purpose to the people who control it." She said that lesbian stereotypes seen in the media are not representative of the term, and that women accepting that they are not sexually attracted to men should not fear acknowledging it or feel that it is limiting. She felt that the more the term is used, "the more girls and women [will] feel comfortable" using it and the less it can be weaponized.

In relation to transgender people

Butch lesbians and transgender men 
Some radical feminists say that transgender activism erases butch lesbians, by pressuring them to instead identify as trans men due to their gender nonconformity. A number of lesbians say that they were tomboys or experienced gender dysphoria as a child. Some younger lesbians report having felt conflicted about whether to transition, or felt pressured to transition, then later detransitioned.

Tristan Fox of AfterEllen stated that today's "tomboys are pushed to transition", describing transgender activism as being "about lesbian erasure, gay eugenics, the genocide of lesbians."

In The Stranger, Katie Herzog wrote that radical feminists use detransition stories to frame gender transition as a social contagion ("rapid-onset gender dysphoria"), and a "patriarchal attempt" to erase butch women. Herzog compares this with right-wing groups using the ex-gay movement to portray homosexuality as a choice. Herzog identifies increased visibility, social acceptance, and access to trans health care as alternative explanations for the increased prevalence of trans and non-binary identity.

Writing for The Economist, trans author Charlie Kiss argued that the stereotype of trans men being "lesbians in denial" is "demeaning and wrong". Kiss wrote that he "could not have tried harder or longer to be a "true lesbian" but that it never felt right. 

In 2017, Ruth Hunt, then CEO of the LGBT charity Stonewall and a butch lesbian, wrote that transphobic groups present the advancement of trans rights as erasing the identities of younger butch lesbians, but argues that this claim is unsubstantiated by facts. Hunt notes that more young people are accessing support resources to explore identity, but emphasizes that "talking to a specialist is not the same as transitioning. Very few young people who access support go on to transition. This is what we would expect: that’s what much successful gender treatment looks like."

In relation to transgender women 

Discord between cisgender lesbians and transgender women concerns the topic of sexual orientation and those who do and do not believe that trans women can be lesbians without erasing what it means to be a lesbian. Gina Davidson of The Scotsman stated, "At its heart is the focus on trans rights by LGBT organisations, and resultant philosophical and biological questions around what defines a woman, and its impact on sexual orientation and therefore lesbianism." She commented, "Is lesbianism a sexual attraction only to female bodies or is it attraction to feminine identity? Can it involve trans women who still have male bodies?" The disputes have resulted in discord at LGBT events. New Zealand group Lesbian Rights Alliance Aotearoa was banned from marching in Wellington Pride because it was "'not being inclusive enough' of trans people", while individual members of LRAA were still able to march. At Vancouver, Canada's Dyke March, the group The Lesbians Collective was told to exclude lesbian pride placards and symbols which march organizers said were exclusionary of trans women. Such disputes have also occurred in the United States and in LGBT communities across the United Kingdom.

The term lesbian erasure has been used by some radical feminists, such as members of the United Kingdom organization Get the L Out, which focuses on excluding trans women from the lesbian community and propose the creation of an autonomous community by "removing the already marginalised L from an alliance that is failing lesbians."  The group argues that lesbians are "constantly vilified and excluded from the GBT community for stating their exclusive sexual preference" and "under huge pressure within their LGBT+ groups to accept transwomen as sexual partners so as not to be labelled as trans-exclusionary radical feminists", that the expansion of transgender rights erases lesbians, that transgender activism encourages lesbians to transition to straight men, and that the GBT community is becoming increasingly anti-lesbian and misogynistic. The group staged its first protest at the 2018 London Pride Parade and was condemned as transphobic or "anti-trans" by the organizers of Pride in London, and by Owl Fisher in The Guardian. 

Applying the terms transphobic, bigot or similar terminology to lesbians who do not consider trans women, including those who have not undergone sex reassignment surgery, as sexual partners has been argued to be a form of lesbian erasure or conversion therapy. A situation in which a lesbian declines to date a trans woman may be referred to as "the cotton ceiling" (a phrase coined as a parallel with the glass ceiling to describe the difficulty transgender women face when seeking a romantic or sexual relationship with a cisgender lesbian). Terry MacDonald of the New Statesman stated that the term cotton ceiling "smacks of misogyny and male entitlement" and that "it isn't just radical feminists who find [calling lesbians transphobic for not accepting trans women as sexual partners] problematic: some trans women do too. Is that really just irrational bigotry?" MacDonald and scholars at Daily Nous stated that TERF (short for "trans exclusionary radical feminist") may also be used to refer to cisgender lesbians who are not sexually attracted to trans women. Feminist theorist Claire Heuchan cited use of "vaginophile", "vagina fetishist", "transmisogynist", and "penis demonizer" for cisgender lesbians who decline to date or have sex with trans women and stated that she has yet to see "a gay man accused of being a penis fetishist, penisphile, or vagina demonizer as a result of his sexuality – that's reserved for the women. Somehow, it always is." 

Sarah Ditum of the New Statesman stated that the sexual attraction debate matters so much to lesbians because they "have consistently faced everything from mockery to violence for insisting on boundaries to their sexuality" and that some have experienced corrective rape. Heuchan said that "women have spent the last few thousand years being conditioned and coerced into having sex that involves a penis" and that it is unfair and dehumanizing "to reduce lesbian women's sexuality into nothing more than a source of validation for trans women." She said it "is dangerous to conflate women treating someone with respect with women considering someone as a potential sexual partner, especially in a political context where women's rights face fresh jeopardy." Heuchan argued that "lesbian is again a contested category" and "even acknowledging lesbian visibility is described as 'dogwhistle transphobia'. ... Lesbophobia isn't coming from social conservatism as it has in the past, but within the LGBT+ community." African-American lesbian performance artist and writer Pippa Fleming, writing in The Economist, stated, "Lesbian identity is now being dubbed as exclusionary or transphobic. You're damn right it's exclusive: lesbians have a right to say no to the phallus, no matter how it's concealed or revealed." She added that "patriarchy and sex-based oppression are real, and they remain the driving force behind the invisibility of black lesbians. The gender-identity movement's attempt to rebrand the lesbian as queer, and the pronouncement that 'anyone can be a lesbian', are nothing short of erasure."

Many LGBT activists have opposed use of the term lesbian erasure with regard to transgender activism. In a 2018 open letter opposing this use, twelve editors and publishers of eight lesbian publications stated, "We do not think supporting trans women erases our lesbian identities; rather we are enriched by trans friends and lovers, parents, children, colleagues and siblings." Carrie Lyell, editor of DIVA magazine and creator of the letter, stated that "while there's no denying women are marginalised within the LGBT+ movement, this having anything to do with trans people, or trans issues, is news to me." She referred to the argument that trans women are pressuring lesbians to "accept them as sexual partners" as "scaremongering". Shannon Keating of BuzzFeed argued that "though lesbians are by no means under attack by gains in trans acceptance, it's true that American attitudes about gender identity are evolving, which has started to impact the way many of us think about sexual orientation."

Abigail Curlew of Vice argued that noting that cisgender people may find themselves sexually attracted to a trans woman, especially if relaxing their "preconceived notions and stereotypes of transgender folks", is "very different than saying that if you're not attracted to trans women you are transphobic." She said she is not shaming people for their sexual orientation or stating that there is no biological influence, but is instead noting societal prejudice and asking them to "critically reflect on the factors that might shape [their] attractions." Author Morgan Lev Edward Holleb argued that trans-exclusionary radical feminist lesbians "are absolutely horrified at the possibility of being attracted to a trans woman because it would undermine their status as the bastion of lesbian separatist feminists, being attracted to someone they incorrectly consider a 'man.'"  Holleb added that transgender people "are acutely aware of the biological differences between [trans] and cis people" and that "trans people aren't trying to 'erase' biological differences, we're trying to secure our basic rights, and highlight shared struggles when we talk about activism and justice."

See also 
 Bisexual erasure
 Lesbian Avengers
 Lesbophobia
 Queer erasure
 Straightwashing

Notes

References

Further reading

 
 
 
 
 
 
 
 
 
 
 
  (Sister Outrider received the 2016 Best Blog award from  Write to End Violence Against Women.)
 
 
 
 
 
 
 
 
 
 
 
 
 
 

Books and journals

 
 
 
 
  (via University of Leicester)
 
 
 
 

Lesbian feminism
Lesbian history
Lesbophobia
Political lesbianism
LGBT erasure